The Hill class of Admiralty trawlers was a small class of trawlers built for the British Royal Navy during the Second World War.

The purpose of the order was to make use of specialist mercantile shipyards to provide vessels for war use by adapting commercial designs to Admiralty specifications.

In 1940 the Royal Navy ordered eight such vessels from Cook Welton and Gemmell. All saw active service, and two were lost in action.

Ships
 Birdlip (T218), completed 11 December 1941: torpedoed, W Africa, 13 June 1944
  Bredon (T223), completed 2 April 1942: torpedoed, N Atlantic, 8 February 1943
 Butser (T219), completed 8 January 1942
 Duncton (T220), completed 27 January 1942
 Dunkery (T224), completed 23 April 1942
 Inkpen (T225), completed 23 May 1942
 Portsdown (T221), completed 19 February 1942
 Yestor (T222), completed 12 March 1942

See also
 Trawlers of the Royal Navy

Notes

References
 Conway : Conway's All the World's Fighting Ships 1922–1946 (1980) 
Elliott, Peter: Allied Escort Ships of World War II (1977)

External links
 Hill class trawlers at uboat.net

Naval trawlers of the United Kingdom
Anti-submarine trawlers of the Royal Navy